Play Magnus may refer to:

 Play Magnus Group, a Norwegian chess company co-founded by Magnus Carlsen
 Play Magnus (mobile app), a computer chess mobile app developed by Play Magnus Group